Cumberland High School can refer to:

In the United States
Cumberland High School (Illinois) in Toledo, Illinois
Cumberland High School (Rhode Island) in Cumberland, Rhode Island
Cumberland High School (Virginia) in Cumberland, Virginia
Cumberland High School (Wisconsin) in Cumberland, Wisconsin

Cumberland County High School (Kentucky) in Burkesville, Kentucky
Cumberland County High School (Tennessee) in Crossville, Tennessee
Cumberland Regional High School in Seabrook, New Jersey

Elsewhere
Cumberland High School (Carlingford) in Carlingford, Australia
Cumberland High School, Jamaica in Portmore, Jamaica
Cumberland High School (Cumberland, British Columbia) Canada